The Jamaican-American music project Major Lazer has released four studio albums, one compilation album, four remix albums, six extended plays, five mixtapes, forty-two singles and six promotional singles.

Albums

Studio albums

Compilation albums

Remix albums

Mixtapes
2009: Major Lazer Essential Mix  
2010: Lazerproof 
2010: Major Lazer Summer Mix 
2013: Major Lazer Workout Mix
2014: Major Lazer's Walshy Fire Presents: Jesse Royal – Royally Speaking

Extended plays

Singles

As lead artist

Notes
 A  "Jah No Partial" did not chart on the Ultratop chart, but peaked at number 59 on the Flemish Ultratip chart.
 B  "Scare Me" did not chart on the Ultratop chart, but peaked at number 37 on the Wallonia Ultratip chart.
 C  "Keep Cool (Life Is What)" did not chart on the Ultratop chart, but peaked at number 38 on the Flemish Ultratip chart.
 D  "Aerosol Can" did not chart on the Ultratop chart, but peaked at number 32 on the Flemish Ultratip chart.
 E  "Miss You" did not chart on the Ultratop chart, but peaked at number 15 on the Flemish Ultratip chart.
 F  "Que Calor" did not enter the Billboard Hot 100, but peaked at number 23 on the Bubbling Under Hot 100 chart.
 G  "Que Calor" did not chart on the Ultratop chart, but peaked at number 11 on the Flemish Ultratip chart.

As featured artist

Promotional singles

Other charted songs

Guest appearances

Remixes

Notes

References

Discography
Diplo
Electronic music discographies
Discographies of American artists
Discographies of Jamaican artists